Thorsten Nesch (born December 21, 1968) is a German author who lives in Lethbridge, Alberta, Canada.

Nesch received national and international literary grants and was Writer in Residence in H.A.L.D. (Denmark) and in Hausach (Hausacher LeseLenz). During the LeseLenz residency he also taught YA fiction writing at the University of Education, Karlsruhe.

References

External links

1968 births
Canadian writers of young adult literature
Writers from Lethbridge
German emigrants to Canada
Living people